Borreby Castle is a fortified manor house located near Skælskør, Slagelse Municipality, in the south-west corner of the island of Zealand, in eastern Denmark.

History

Early history
First mentioned in 1345, by the end of the century Borreby had come into the possession of the Urne family, an important house of high nobility in Denmark at that time. In 1410 the estate was acquired by Bishop Peder Jensen Lodehat and it was then held by the Bishops of Roskilde until its confiscation by the Crown in 1536 in connection with the Reformation in 1534.

Friis era: The current building

In 1553, possibly somewhat earlier, King Frederick II ceded the property to Chancellor Johan Friis, one of the most powerful men in the country at the time, who also owned Hesselagergård on the island of Funen.

After Johan Friis' death in 1570, Borreby was passed to his nephew, Christian Friis, who later followed in his uncle's footsteps as Chancellor from 1594 to 1616. Christian Friis expanded the complex with an extra moat and several new buildings, including two castle yard wings to the east and west, a gatehouse and several large farm buildings west of the castle.

The estate remained in the possession of the Friis family until the brothers Oluf and Valdemar Daa ran it into economic ruin during their ownership from 1652 to 1681.

Castenschiold era: Hans Christian Andersen connection

In 1783, Borreby was acquired by Major General Joachim Castenschiold.

Together with nearby Holsteinborg and Basnæs, Borreby later in the century formed a small cluster of manor houses where Hans Christian Andersen was a frequent guest. In 1859 Andersen published his story "The Wind Tells about Valdemar Daae and His Daughters", a tragic tale of how the last descendant of Johan Friss to own Borreby lost the estate through his own foolish and quite unsuccessful experiments with alchemy.

The Castenschiold family still own the property.

Architecture

Built in red brick in the Renaissance style, Borreby consists of two and a half floors resting on stone plinth and topped by a pitched roof. There are four towers, three on the north side and a staircase tower on the south side. The masonry is decorated with arched friezes above each storey and the windows are topped by depressed arches.

The defensive character of the building is witnessed by machicolation holes which are found on all sides. Behind these there used to be a walkway which has now been removed, but machicolation holes can still be seen all round the building.

The interior is dominated by Joachim Lorentz Holten Castenschiold's modernizations carried out in the 1750s and restorations from 1883 to 1884 and 1923–24.

The east and west wings of the outer courtyard date from Christian Friis' expansion, as does the gatehouse from 1600 and the large farm buildings located west of the castle. A chapel in the west wing was in its current form designed in 1754.

In the 21st century
Borreby Castle is owned by and managed as a modern agricultural estate with a large production of biomass for power stations on Zealand. There is public access free of charge to the outer courtyard and park with views of the historical buildings. The castle is also open for tours on prior notification.

It is also used as a cultural venue. Borreby Art Gallery is based in the former courthouse as well as some former stables. Borreby Theatre with a capacity of 450 spectators is currently under construction in a former barn, and other buildings will house a restaurant and café.

List of owners
 (1345) Niels Jensen 
 (-1392) Lave Nielsen Urne 
 (1392-) Zabel Kerkendorp 
 (-1410) Fikke Kerkendorp 
 (-1410) Radike Kerkendorp 
 (1410-) Roskilde Bispestol 
 (-1536) Grev Christoffer 
 (1536-1553) Kronen 
 (1553-1570) Johan Friis 
 (1570-1616) Christian Friis 
 (1616-1617) Mette Hardenberg, gift Friis 
 (1617-1618) Dorthe Friis, gift Daa 
 (1618-1641) Claus Daa 
 (1641-1652) Jørgen Daa 
 (1652-1666) Oluf Daa 
 (1652-1681) Valdemar Daa 
 (1681-1685) Ove Ramel 
 (1685-1730) Mette Rosenkrantz, gift Ramel 
 (1730-1732) Else Ovesdatter Ramel 
 (1732-1750) Christian Berregaard 
 (1750-1769) Villum Berregaard 
 (1769-) Beata Antonia Augusta Reuss-Lobenstein, gift Berregaard 
 (-1776) Frederik Berregaard 
 (1776-1783) Hans Georg Faith 
 (1783-1817) Joachim Melchior Holten Castenschiold 
 (1817-1832) Henrik Gisbert Castenschiold 
 (1832-1865) Adolph Frederik Holten Castenschiold 
 (1865-1919) Carl Vilhelm Behagen Castenschiold 
 (1919-1945) Adolf Frederik Holten Castenschiold 
 (1945-1961) Carl Christian Henrik Castenschiold 
 (-present) Joachim Lorentz Castenschiold

References

External links

 Official website (in Danish)
 Borreby Theatre (in Danish)
 "The Wind Tells about Valdemar Daae and His Daughters" by Hans Christian Andersen (in English)

Houses completed in 1556
Castles in Denmark
Listed buildings and structures in Slagelse Municipality
Listed castles and manor houses in Denmark
Manor houses in Slagelse Municipality
Castles in Region Zealand
1556 establishments in Denmark
Buildings and structures associated with the Friis family
Buildings and structures associated with the Daa family
Buildings and structures associated with the Castenschiold family